Pedro Alonso Niño (c. 1455 – c. 1505) was an Afro-Spanish explorer. He piloted the Santa María during Christopher Columbus's first voyage to the Americas in 1492, and accompanied him on his third voyage in 1498 to Trinidad.

Biography
Niño was born in Moguer, Spain he was known as El Negro. His father was Juan Nino, a Spanish sailor, and his mother was an unknown African woman. According to the folklore, Juan Nino was one of the captured European sailors in the Ghanaian settlement Elmina. He sired four famous sailor children namely Pedro Alonso, Francisco, Juan, and one other Niño.  

He explored the west coast of Africa in his early years and many other places. Niño guided Columbus and navigated the Atlantic Ocean as he piloted the Santa María during Christopher Columbus's expedition of 1492, and accompanied him during his third voyage that saw the discovery of Trinidad and the mouths of the Orinoco River. 
After returning to Spain, Niño made preparations to explore the Indies independently, looking for gold and pearls. Empowered by the Council of Castile to seek out new countries, avoiding those already found by Columbus, he committed to give 20% of his profits to the Spanish Crown (see quinto real). 

In the company of brothers Luis and Cristóbal de la Guerra, respectively a rich merchant and a pilot, he left San Lucas in May 1499, and, after twenty-three days, they arrived at Maracapana. Visiting the islands of Isla Margarita, Coche, and Cubagua, they exchanged objects of little value for a large number of pearls before sailing up the coast to Punta Araya, where they discovered salt mines.

After just two months they were back in Bayona, Spain, loaded with wealth. However, they were accused of cheating King Ferdinand II out of his portion of the spoils. Arrested, and with his property confiscated, Niño died before the conclusion of his trial.

Death 
Pedro died around 1505.

Legacy 
There is a monument to Pedro Alonso Niño in the Convent of San Francisco in Moguer, Spain. In 1930, Niño was honored with one of the 33 dioramas at the American Negro Exposition in Chicago.

See also
 Niño brothers

Notes

References
 This source gives around 1455 as the year of his birth.

1460s births
1505 deaths
People from the Province of Huelva
Spanish explorers
Spanish period of Trinidad and Tobago
History of Venezuela
15th-century explorers
15th-century Castilians
16th-century Spanish people